The Battle of Huizhou was fought between the 4th Army of Miao Peinan and the 11th Army of Chen Mingshu. Miao retreated to Huizhou after his defeat by Li Jishen at the Battle of Guangzhou. After his defeat, Miao retreated to his hometown of Wuhua, Guangdong. It was one of many internal conflicts within the Kuomintang in the aftermath of Chiang Kai-shek's successes in the Northern Expedition.

Bibliography
中華民國國防大學編，《中國現代軍事史主要戰役表》

Conflicts in 1927
Conflicts in 1928
Conflicts in Guangdong